The bare-eyed myna (Streptocitta albertinae) is a large, long-tailed species of starling in the family Sturnidae. Its common name is a reference to the large patch of dark bare skin around the eyes. Due to its superficial resemblance to a magpie, it has been referred to as the Sula magpie in the past. It is endemic to tropical open lowland forests on the Indonesian islands of Taliabu and Mangole in the Sula Islands. It is threatened by habitat loss.

References

External links
Image at ADW

Birds described in 1866
Endemic birds of Sulawesi
Streptocitta
Taxonomy articles created by Polbot